Saıağaç is a village in Anamur district of Mersin Province, Turkey. The population of Sarıağaç is 191  as of 2011.It is planned that a part of the village (along with Akine, Çaltıbükü and Ormancık) will be submerged in Alaköprü Dam reservoir.

References

Villages in Anamur District